Alix Bénézech is a French actress.

Biography
Alix Bénézech was raised in Alsace and the south of France.

She holds a bachelor's degree with honors and validates a master's degree in modern literature while taking singing, dance and acting lessons. She speaks French, English and German.

In 2018, Alix Bénézech was chosen to be the heart godmother of the Haute couture Franck Sorbier fashion show and she was the muse of the new Mod's Hair campaign and became the first actress ambassador for Jaguar.

Filmography

Film

Television

Theater
 2010/2011 : Le Fantôme de l’Opéra by Henri Lazarini as Christine Daaé
 2012 : Les Serments Indiscrets by Anne-Marie Lazarini as Lucile
 2013 : Elvira by Jean-Claude Scionico asElvira
 2015 : Blanche Neige ou la Chute du Mur de Berlin by Métilde Weyergan and Samuel Hercule as Ida
 2017 : Fragments by Marilyn Monroe
 2018 : A Fleur de Mots by Jean-Pierre Baro as Lisa
 2019 : Les Rivaux by Anne-Marie Lazarini as Lydia Languish

Awards

Winner
 2011: Prix d'Interprétation of the Festival Ciné Poche for Train-Potins
 2016: Prix d'Interprétation of the Festival Les Hérault du Cinéma et de la Télé for Bis
 2017: Best Actress of the Festival Feel the Reel International Film and Honourable Mention of the Festival Howling Wolf Film for La Boulangerie

Nominee

 2014 : Lutin de la Meilleure Actrice of Les Lutins du Court Métrage for Le Quepa sur la vilni !

References

External links 
 
 

French actresses
French film actresses
1991 births
21st-century French actresses
Living people